Painted with Raven is a makeup competition television series hosted by Raven, which premiered on WOW Presents Plus on November 25, 2021. RuPaul serves as co-executive producer alongside Randy Barbato, Fenton Bailey, and Tom Campbell of World of Wonder. After two weeks of the debut competition show, on December 9, 2021, it was announced that it had been picked up for a second season.

Format 
Each week contestants compete in challenges for points. The best performing contestant of the week is awarded three points and the lowest-performing contestant receives none and is muted, thus unable to compete in the following episode's challenge. The winner of the show is determined through a final showdown and receives a cash prize of $25,000. The show is shot virtually with contestants competing from their own homes.

Series overview

Season 1 (2021) 

The first season of Painted with Raven began airing on November 25, 2021 on World of Wonder's streaming service, WOW Presents Plus. The season ran for 8 episodes and concluded on January 13, 2022. Matt, Tajh, and Yvonne made the final, and Matt was the winner of the first season.

Season 2 (2022) 

On December 9, 2021, it was announced that World of Wonder renewed the series for a second season. On November 9, 2022, the second season's trailer was revealed with its casting.

Awards

References

External links 

 

2020s American reality television series
2020s LGBT-related reality television series
2021 American television series debuts
American LGBT-related reality television series
Drag (clothing) television shows
Reality competition television series
WOW Presents Plus original programming